Asota paphos is a moth of the family Erebidae first described by Johan Christian Fabricius in 1787. It is found from the north-eastern Himalayas to Sundaland.

The wingspan is 55–59 mm.

Subspecies
Asota paphos leuconota (Indonesia (Java, Sumatra), Philippines)
Asota paphos paphos (China, India, Indonesia (Borneo, Sumatra), Malaysia, Philippines, Singapore)

References
Zwier, Jaap. "Asota paphos paphos Fabricius 1787". Aganainae (Snouted Tigers). Retrieved August 5, 2019.

Asota (moth)
Moths of Asia
Moths described in 1787